Yelena Ilinichna Podkaminskaya (also tr. Elena; ; born 10 April 1979) is a Russian theatre, television and film actress. She starred in the television series Kitchen (Кухня).

She graduated from WTU. BV Shchukin (course A Shirvindt) in 2001; she participated in the group Theater of Satire in 2000.

Biography
Yelena Podkaminskaya was born in Moscow, a musical family, founded in Shcherbinka arts studio "Rainbow", directs the music studio of the elementary music-making "Rainbow" and is a member of the city council Scherbinkinskogo.

She graduated from the Boris Shchukin Theatre Institute (2001, the rate of A. Schirvindt). Since 2000, she works in a staff of the troupe of Moscow Satire Theatre.

Her film debut was in the role of Ursula Bourne in the film "Failure Poirot" (2002, directed by Sergei Ursuliak). Since 2012, she is best known for her participation in the television series "Kitchen".

In June 2013, Elena Podkaminskaya appeared on the cover of men's magazine Maxim. On November 30, 2013, she won the show Dancing with the Stars with her partner Andrey Karpov.

From 6 September to 28 December 2014, she participated in a weekly television show of the First Channel, Ice Age-5 with partner Peter Tchernyshev and won the Audience Award.

Filmography

Film

Television

References

External links 

 Yelena Podkaminskaya bio at Lifeactor.ru 

1979 births
Living people
Russian film actresses
Russian television actresses
Russian stage actresses
Actresses from Moscow
21st-century Russian actresses